Guntmadingen is a former municipality in the canton of Schaffhausen in Switzerland.  On 1 January 2013 the former municipality of Guntmadingen merged into the municipality of Beringen.

History

Guntmadingen is first mentioned in 1111 as Guntrammingin, though this comes from a 12th-century forgery.  In 1122 it was mentioned as Guntramingin.

Coat of arms
The blazon of the municipal coat of arms is Per pale Gules a Dove Argent statant on a Cross patte sable regardant to sinister holding in the beak a branch Vert and of the last a Garb Or.

Geography
Of this area, 37.8% is used for agricultural purposes, while 56.7% is forested. The rest of the land, (5.5%) is settled.

The municipality is located in the Oberklettgau district.  The farming municipality is located at the foot of the Lauferberg and includes a high, forested region.

Demographics
Guntmadingen had a population (as of 2010) of 237. In 2008 a total of 5.6% were foreign nationals.  Of the foreign population,, 35.7% are from Germany, 14.3% are from Italy, and 50% are from another country. Over the last 10 years the population has grown at a rate of 4.7%.  Most of the population speaks German (97.3%), with Swedish being second most common ( 0.8%) and English being third ( 0.4%).

The age distribution of the population is children and teenagers (0–19 years old) make up 25.4% of the population, while adults (20–64 years old) make up 59.7% and seniors (over 64 years old) make up 14.9%.

In the 2007 federal election the most popular party was the SVP which received 65.1% of the vote.  The next two most popular parties were the SP (21.3%), and the FDP (13.6%) .

The entire Swiss population is generally well educated.  In Guntmadingen about 77.1% of the population (between age 25–64) have completed either non-mandatory upper secondary education or additional higher education (either university or a Fachhochschule). In Guntmadingen, 2.86% of the population attend kindergarten or another pre-school, 8.98% attend a Primary School, 2.45% attend a lower level Secondary School, and 3.27% attend a higher level Secondary School.

, 10.1% of the population belonged to the Roman Catholic Church and 77.1% belonged to the Swiss Reformed Church.

The historical population is given in the following table:

Economy
Guntmadingen has an unemployment rate of 0.73%.  , there were 43 people employed in the primary economic sector and about 15 businesses involved in this sector.  9 people are employed in the secondary sector and there are 4 businesses in this sector.  8 people are employed in the tertiary sector, with 4 businesses in this sector.

 the mid year average unemployment rate was 0.6%.  There were 8 non-agrarian businesses in the municipality and 40% of the (non-agrarian) population was involved in the secondary sector of the economy while 60% were involved in the third.  At the same time, 55% of the working population was employed full-time, and 45% was employed part-time.  There were 20 residents of the municipality who were employed in some capacity, of which females made up 35% of the workforce.   there were 39 residents who worked in the municipality, while 84 residents worked outside Guntmadingen and 15 people commuted into the municipality for work.

, there is 1 restaurant and the hospitality industry in Guntmadingen employs 4 people.

References

External links

 

Former municipalities of the canton of Schaffhausen